The 2006–07 Purdue Boilermakers men's basketball team represented Purdue University during the 2006-07 NCAA Division I men's basketball season.

Roster

Schedule

References

2006–07 Big Ten Conference men's basketball season
Purdue Boilermakers men's basketball seasons
Purdue
Purd
Purd